The Hakaru River is a river in the Northland Region of New Zealand. It starts in the Brynderwyn Hills and flows south to join the Topuni River exiting in the Oruawharo River, which forms part of the Kaipara Harbour.

The name literally means "to shake" in the Māori language. Traditionally it was known as Te Hakoru to Te Tai Tokerau Māori, but was transcribed as Hakaru on an 1870 map.

See also
List of rivers of New Zealand

References

Land Information New Zealand - Search for Place Names

Kaipara District
Rivers of the Northland Region
Rivers of New Zealand
Kaipara Harbour catchment